is a Japanese female weightlifter, competing in the 58 kg category and representing Japan at international competitions.

She participated at the 2000 Summer Olympics in the 58 kg event but did not mark.

References

External links
http://www.todor66.com/weightlifting/World/1996/Women_under_59kg.html
http://www.gettyimages.no/detail/news-photo/yuriko-takahashi-of-japan-lifts-in-the-womens-58-kilogram-news-photo/1184002#sep-2000-yuriko-takahashi-of-japan-lifts-in-the-womens-58-kilogram-picture-id1184002

1973 births
Living people
Japanese female weightlifters
Weightlifters at the 2000 Summer Olympics
Olympic weightlifters of Japan
People from Niigata (city)
Weightlifters at the 1994 Asian Games
Medalists at the 1994 Asian Games
Asian Games bronze medalists for Japan
World Weightlifting Championships medalists
Asian Games medalists in weightlifting
20th-century Japanese women
21st-century Japanese women